Kincaid v. Gibson, 236 F. 3d 342 (6th Cir. 2001) was a United States court case before the United States Court of Appeals for the Sixth Circuit dealing with freedom of expression.

Charles Kincaid and Carpi Coffer, students at Kentucky State University, filed the suit against Betty Gibson, KSU's Vice President for Student Affairs.

In 1994, the Kentucky State University administration reviewed the school yearbook, The Thorobred, and decided that its quality was not satisfactory. In particular, the administration felt as though the yearbook featured too many images related to current events and objected to the lack of school colors on the yearbook cover, among other things.

Charles Kincaid and Carpi Coffer filed suit on behalf of the students against Gibson and the members of the university's Board of Regents. Initially, the lower courts granted the University's motion to dismiss—citing Hazelwood v. Kuhlmeier as an example of how students' speech in a school-sponsored setting can be censored by administrations. Eventually, the case made it to the Sixth Court of Appeals, who affirmed the District Court's dismissal. The students then appealed to have the circuit court rule en banc, a motion which the Court of appeals granted. The en bank panel of the court heard the case on May 30, 2000 and decided in favor of the students with a 10-3 majority on January 5, 2001.

Kincaid v. Gibson was influential in deciding that Hazelwood v. Kuhlmeier, which allowed school districts to censor material in a school publications, did not apply to colleges and universities.

In early 2001, the parties reached a settlement, with KSU paying each student plaintiff $5,000 and attorney's fees of $60,000. As a part of the settlement, all students received the yearbook they had paid for in 1994.

External links
 http://www.belcherfoundation.org/kincaid_v_gibson.htm

References 

United States Free Speech Clause case law
United States Court of Appeals for the Sixth Circuit cases
2001 in United States case law
Kentucky State University
Yearbooks
Student rights case law in the United States